Pavel Micheev (born May 30, 1983) is a Kazakh professional basketball player, currently with Barsy Atyrau of the FIBA Asia Champions Cup and the Kazakhstan Basketball Championship.

He represented Kazakhstan's national basketball team at the 2016 FIBA Asia Challenge in Tehran, Iran, where he played most minutes for his team.

References

External links
 FIBA profile
 FIBA profile at 2016 FIBA Asia Champions Cup 
 Asia-basket.com profile

1983 births
Living people
Forwards (basketball)
Kazakhstani men's basketball players
Kazakhstani people of Russian descent